Denny Moore (born 1944) is an American linguist, and anthropologist.

He graduated from the University of Michigan, and from the City University of New York with a Ph.D. in Anthropology.
He has worked for the Brazilian National Council for Scientific and Technological Development, and is Coordinator of the Linguistics Division, Museu Paraense Emilio Goeldi, Belem-Para, Brazil.
He published a grammar of Gavião, a Brazilian Amazonian language.  He is on the advisory board of the Center for Amazon Community Ecology.

Awards
1999 MacArthur Fellows Program

Works
"Endangered Languages of Lowland Tropical South America", Language diversity endangered, Editor Matthias Brenzinger, Walter de Gruyter, 2007

References

External links
"Can You Sleep in a Hammock? And a Few Other Questions that Never Came up in Field Methods Class", Colorado Research in Linguistics, June 2004, Kristine Stenzel
After the trees: living on the Transamazon Highway, Douglas Ian Stewart, University of Texas Press, 1994, 

Linguists from the United States
University of Michigan alumni
Graduate Center, CUNY alumni
MacArthur Fellows
Living people
1944 births